Dragoon Pass is a gap between the Dragoon Mountains and Little Dragoon Mountains in Cochise County, Arizona.

References

Landforms of Cochise County, Arizona
Mountain passes of Arizona